Turnbull School is a full-time private, non-denominational school for students in Junior Kindergarten to grade 8 located in the Carlington neighbourhood of Ottawa, Ontario, Canada.

History
Turnbull School was founded in 1992 by Mary Ann S. Turnbull, M. Ed., and moved to its present location on former Central Experimental Farm/National Capital Commission land in 1996, the property being 5½ acres. The initial building included two levels of classrooms, two computer labs, a library, offices, a gym. The school was founded following on the success of the Turnbull Learning Centre (previously the "part-time academic assistance" branch of the school) which was established in 1981 and which offered academic services to the wider community until 2010. The school underwent a major expansion, completed in 2003, that saw the addition of a state-of-the-art computer lab and science lab (both equipped with SmartBoard technology), new grade 7 and 8 classrooms, a double gymnasium with a fold-down stage, a visual arts room, music studio, and common areas.

Accomplishments

Green School Recognition
On April 20, 2007, Turnbull was recognized by the  SEEDS Foundation as completing 100 Green School projects.  Only a few hundred schools in Canada are members of this prestigious club. Such projects that were recognized were Science Fairs, composting left over lunches, no idling policy, extensive recycling and many other activities.

Twinning
The school is twinned with Sephapenong Primary School in Lesotho, which is helped by the organization Help Lesotho.

Academics

Awards and Graduation
Every year, on the second Friday of June, the school has a graduation for its grade 8s. There are also rewards including:
 The Arthur Evans Award- Arthur Evans (Mary Ann Turnbull's father) was a great athlete but valued fairplay and sportsmanship above all. Winner is the best person that shows these qualities.
 The Doreen Best Award- Doreen Best was Turnbull's Administrator from 1986 until 1991, when she died of cancer. An award is given each year in her memory to a student who exemplifies her qualities of kindness, sense of humour, respect, generosity in helping others, a joy of life, determination, and an uncritical acceptance of others.  The winner consistently shows outstanding character and is a role model to others.
Valedictorian Award- Awarded to an outstanding member of the graduation class.

Honor Role Students in grades 7 & 8 are also recognized. There are three different categories: 80-84% average, 85-89% average, and 90% and above average.

Athletics
Turnbull School has a prestigious physical education program. Turnbull also includes intramural sports and teams. The students are required to wear uniforms for gym.

In October 2010 Turnbull's Grade 4, 5, and 6 Girls and Boys Soccer Teams both came first in their tournaments. The Grade 7 and 8 Girls soccer team came first in their season. The Grade 7 and 8 boys however did not follow up on this success, as they came in 2nd place losing to Ashbury College Grade 8 Boys Soccer Team in the championship game.

Staff
There are 32 teachers at Turnbull. The founder is Mrs. Mary Ann Turnbull and the director is Mr. Gareth Reid. The senior school principal is Mr. Craig Dunn and the primary/junior school principal is Mr. Buddy Clinch.

Uniforms
Turnbull School students do not wear a uniform, although a crested golf shirt is used for special occasions or field trips. Students may wear any clothing, except that which is ripped, displays an inappropriate message, or is deemed too revealing by the staff (spaghetti straps, halter tops, crop tops.) The Turnbull School Concert Band receive uniforms for performances containing oxford shirts and crested vests. Up until the 2008/2009 school year, the senior school (grades 7 and 8) were expected to abide by a stricter dress code, which did not allow students to wear jeans and stated that the students had to wear collared shirts at all times.

See also
Education in Canada

References

External links
The Turnbull School Website

Private schools in Ottawa
Elementary schools in Ottawa
Middle schools in Ottawa